The R501 road is a regional road in County Tipperary in Ireland linking the N62 national secondary road in Templemore to the R498 in Borrisoleigh. 

See also
Roads in Ireland
National primary road
National secondary road

References
Roads Act 1993 (Classification of Regional Roads) Order 2006 – Department of Transport

Regional roads in the Republic of Ireland
Roads in County Tipperary